Through and through describes a situation where an object, real or imaginary, passes completely through another object, also real or imaginary. The phrase has several common uses:

Forensics
Through and through is used in forensics to describe a bullet that has passed through a body, leaving both entry and exit wounds Example..

Printmaking
An image may be through and through in the following cases:
ink or paint has penetrated to the other side
inlaying with another material, stained glass, patchwork, woodwork, linoleum, marble, etc.
carving out (e.g. wood carving), cutting out, perforation: this may concern the outside shape, shaped holes, and patterns of holes (e.g. in a punched card; also a passport may have its number perforated in the pages, to make forgery more difficult).
embroidery etc.

Through and through images are more durable; they do not easily wear off.

In the case that the image can be viewed from the other side, we see the mirror image, just like in the case of a transparent image, such as a drawing on a transparent sheet.

A sheet with a through and through image is achiral. We can distinguish two cases:
the sheet surface with the image has no axis of symmetry parallel to the axis of rotation – the two sides are the same (e.g. U on a page rotated L–R)
the sheet surface with the image has an axis of symmetry parallel to the axis of rotation – the two sides are different (e.g. C on a page rotated L–R)

See also

Flag#Shapes and designs

Symmetry
Decorative arts
Printmaking
Firearm terminology